Ziyaret is a town (belde) and municipality in the Amasya District, Amasya Province, Turkey. Its population is 4,084 (2021).

References

Populated places in Amasya Province
Amasya District
Towns in Turkey